Coleophora entoloma is a moth of the family Coleophoridae. It is found in the United States, including California.

References

entoloma
Moths described in 1913
Moths of North America